Salt Creek Commons is a census-designated place (CDP) in Union Township, Porter County, in the U.S. state of Indiana. The population was 2,117 at the 2010 census.

Geography
The CDP encompasses a housing development to the west of Salt Creek, a north-flowing stream which runs to the Little Calumet River.

Demographics

References

Census-designated places in Porter County, Indiana
Census-designated places in Indiana